Fadami (also Romanized as Fadāmī; also known as Āb-e Shūr, Fadāmī Āb-e Shūr, and Padūmi) is a city in Abshur Rural District, Forg District, Darab County, Fars Province, Iran. At the 2006 census, its population was 4,087, in 826 families.

References 

Populated places in Darab County
Cities in Fars Province